Yannik Omlor (born 3 September 1996 in Hanau) is a German professional squash player. As of July 2019, he was ranked number 117 in the world and was the 3rd internationally highest ranked player in Germany.

References

1996 births
Living people
German male squash players
Sportspeople from Hanau
Competitors at the 2022 World Games